The Romanian Yachting Federation is the national governing body for the sport of sailing in Romanian, recognised by the International Sailing Federation.

References

External links
 Official website

Sports organizations established in 1921
Romania
Sailing
Sailing
1921 establishments in Romania